Fort Knox Middle High School is a middle/high school in Hardin County, Kentucky, United States, serving grades 7–12 on the grounds of Fort Knox. The original building was constructed in 1958, with further additions in 1961, 1966, 1987 and 1989. In April 2009 a $18.1 million construction project funded by money from the Department of Defense Education Activity which runs the Fort Knox Community Schools system was begun to construct a new metal-roofed brick and masonry-facade two-story building, connecting to the existing vocational school and the gym. The new building replaced  of the original 1958 facility. It includes  20 new classrooms, two computer labs, a commons, geothermal heating and air conditioning, recessed lockers for improved traffic flow, and specialized functional areas for art, band, science labs, and technology courses. It has a capacity of 462 students. Groundbreaking was April 2009, construction was completed in July, and the dedication ceremony was held on August 7. Most of the old high school building has been demolished.

The school's mascot is the Eagle.  The mascot is nicknamed Eddy the Eagle. Varsity sports include volleyball, football, swimming, soccer, baseball, basketball, powerlifting, wrestling, track and field, tennis, golf and softball.

Notable alumni
 Romeo Crennel, former NFL head coach of the Cleveland Browns and Kansas City Chiefs; former defensive coordinator of the Houston Texans; current Assistant Head Coach and Defense for the Houston Texans
 Derek Homer, former professional football player 
 Jim Obradovich, former professional baseball player (Houston Astros)
 J.B. Brown, former Harlem Globetrotters and graduate of Kentucky Wesleyan
 Thomas Smith, Ph.D. (football, wrestling), presently the Chair for the Biology and Chemistry Department. (Ave Maria University)

References

External links
Fort Knox High School—Website

Educational institutions established in 1958
Department of Defense Education Activity
Schools in Hardin County, Kentucky
Public high schools in Kentucky
1958 establishments in Kentucky
Fort Knox